Primeira Liga (First League), also known as Liga Sul-Minas-Rio (South-Minas-Rio League) or Copa Sul-Minas-Rio (South-Minas-Rio Cup), was a Brazilian football competition contested between Brazil's South Region, Ceará, Minas Gerais and Rio de Janeiro state teams.

History
The competition was founded in 2015 by clubs that were unhappy with the state championships and their low attendances and revenues. The first edition was played in 2016. The tournament went on hiatus for 2018, before being officially cancelled the following year.

List of champions

References

External links
Official site 

Football cup competitions in Brazil
Recurring sporting events established in 2016
2016 establishments in Brazil